Margaret Lanzetta (born 1 April, 1957) is an American artist who uses abstract, culturally-significant pattern to explore postmodern conditions of fragmentation, migration, and cultural hybridity. Lanzetta engages with a variety of mediums including painting, silkscreen, digital photography, and ceramics. 

Lanzetta’s works are represented in the public collections of the Museum of Modern Art, New York; the British Museum and the Victoria and Albert Museum, London; the Yale University Art Gallery; the Harvard Art Museums; the New York Public Library Print Collection; and the Hallmark Art Collection.

Education 
Lanzetta was born in Waterbury, Connecticut in 1957 and received a BA in Fine Arts in 1979 from the College of the Holy Cross. In 1981, she attended the Skowhegan School of Painting and Sculpture in Maine. Lanzetta received an MFA in 1989 from the School of Visual Arts, New York. In 1989–90, Lanzetta received a Fulbright-Hays Award to study at the Kunstakademie Düsseldorf in the class of Tony Cragg. Lanzetta has cited Ronald Bladen, Ursula von Rydingsvard, and Judy Pfaff as important influences.

Career 
"Lanzetta’s work embodies an innovative marriage of digital technology" with traditional painting and printmaking. Manipulated, fragmented patterns, "often rendered in industrial or printer’s saturated colors" are silkscreened or hand stenciled on canvas or textiles. In mixed media, textile-based paintings, such as Light in Wartime, Lanzetta “examines ideas of ethnicity, non-ethnicity, migration, designs and cross culture…sourcing saris and fabrics and reassembling them in aesthetic combinations.”

The fragmentation of nature, as symbol, inspiration, and eclipser of culture is also a persistent theme in Lanzetta’s work. In the painting Opposite Temperature Zones, the “splintered sakura [Japanese cherry blossoms] of the painting also bring to mind larger issues of genetic piracy, the dangers of invasive species and environmental degradation that threaten these and all other harbingers of future springs.” Lanzetta’s physically insistent painting processes are rooted in her early sculptural work with wrapped and woven industrial rubber.  

With reference to Minimalism's edge to edge compositions, Lanzetta’s all-over designs and mantra-like painting practice reflect her immersion in Eastern religions.

Similar to Pattern and Decoration artists, Lanzetta draws inspiration from outside the United States. While New York-based, Lanzetta has lived and worked as an artist in India, Syria, Japan, Italy, and various countries in Southeast Asia and North Africa. As a result, global and spiritual influences of Buddhism, textiles,  and world politics are persistent sources of inspiration. Each new country becomes a site for artistic investigation.

Exhibitions and Commissions 
Margaret Lanzetta’s work has been exhibited at the Museum of Modern Art and the Queens Museum, New York; the Bangkok National Museum (pop up exhibition); the Weatherspoon Art Museum, North Carolina; and the Nicolaysen Art Museum, Wyoming. The New York MTA Arts & Design commissioned Lanzetta's first public, permanent work, Culture Swirl, a series of seven faceted glass-paneled windscreens, for the Norwood Avenue subway station in 2007. In 2020, Norte Maar commissioned new work by Lanzetta for CounterPointe 8, in collaboration with choreographer Mari Meade. Lanzetta silkscreened on harlequin print rayon, silver brocade, and magenta Thai silk to create swirling textile panels incorporated into the dance. The collaboration, entitled Strategy Royale, premiered to Alessio Natalizia’s "24" by Not Waving.

In 2010, a 20-year survey exhibition, titled Pet The Pretty Tiger, was mounted at the Cantor Gallery in Worcester, Massachusetts. Lanzetta’s work has been exhibited in numerous galleries in New York, and international venues in Tokyo, London, Dusseldorf, Rome, Singapore and Rabat (Morocco).

Lanzetta’s work was included in the 2016 Kochi-Muziris International Biennale Collateral Projects, India.

Fellowships and Awards 
Lanzetta was an inaugural recipient of a Fulbright Global Scholar Award to India, Singapore, and Thailand, from 2016–2019. Earlier awards include a MESA Fulbright Scholar Award to Syria and India in 2007, and an Abbey Fellowship in Painting in 2003 for residency at the British School at Rome. Lanzetta has been awarded fellowships and residencies from the MacDowell Colony, the Ucross Foundation, Greenwich House Pottery, and Dieu Donné. Lanzetta has taught at Parsons School of Design, Western Carolina University, and held visiting artist appointments at Mount Holyoke College and the University of Southern Maine.

References

External links 
 Official Website

1957 births
Living people
People from Waterbury, Connecticut